The Wineville Chicken Coop murders, also known as the Wineville Chicken murders, were a series of abductions and murders of young boys that occurred in the city of Los Angeles and in Riverside County, California between 1926 and 1928. The murders were carried out by Gordon Stewart Northcott, a 19-year-old farmer who had moved to California from Canada two years prior, as well as his mother, Sarah Louise Northcott, and his nephew, Sanford Clark.

Northcott was arrested while visiting his sister in Canada in November 1928. The case received national attention due to one of the assumed victims being Walter Collins, the nine-year-old son of Christine Collins, who had gone missing in March of that year. While authorities initially considered the possibility that the total number of boys killed on the farm might have been as high as 20, this theory was eliminated as the investigation began to unfold. Northcott was found guilty of three of the murders in February 1929, and was executed at San Quentin State Prison in October 1930.

Murders 
Gordon Stewart Northcott was born in Bladworth, Saskatchewan, Canada, and raised in British Columbia. He moved to Los Angeles, California, with his parents in 1924. Two years later, at the age of 19, Northcott asked his father to purchase a plot of land in the community of Wineville, located in Riverside County, where he built a chicken ranch and a house with the help of his father and his nephew, 11-year-old Sanford Clark. It was under this pretext that Northcott brought Clark from Bladworth to the U.S. Upon the boy's arrival at the Wineville ranch, Northcott began to physically and sexually abuse Clark.

In August 1928, out of concern for his welfare, Clark's 19-year-old older sister Jessie visited him at the Wineville ranch. At that time, Clark told her that he feared for his life. One night, while Northcott was asleep, Jessie learned from Clark that Northcott had murdered four boys at his ranch. Once she returned to Canada a week later, Jessie informed an American consul there of Northcott's crimes. The consul then wrote a letter to the Los Angeles Police Department (LAPD) detailing Jessie's sworn complaint. Because there was initially some concern over an immigration issue, the LAPD contacted the United States Immigration Service to determine facts relating to the complaint.

On August 31, 1928, Immigration Service inspectors Judson F. Shaw and George W. Scallorn visited the ranch. Northcott, having seen the agents driving up the long road to his ranch, fled into the treeline at the edge of his property, telling Clark to stall them and threatening to shoot him from the treeline with a rifle if he didn't comply. For the next two hours, while Clark stalled, Northcott kept running. Finally, when Clark felt that the agents could protect him, he told them that Northcott had fled.

Northcott and his mother, Sarah Louise, fled to Canada but were arrested near Vernon, British Columbia, on September 19, 1928. Clark testified at Sarah Louise's sentencing that Northcott had kidnapped, molested, beaten, and killed three young boys with the help of his mother and Clark himself. Clark also testified about the murder of a fourth young man, a Mexican citizen (possibly Alvin Gothea), whose decapitated head Northcott had forced Clark to dispose of by burning it in a fire pit and then crushing the skull. Northcott stated that he "left the headless body by the side of the road near [La] Puente because he had no other place to put it." He stated that quicklime was used to dispose of the remains and that the bodies were buried on the ranch.

Body parts found
Authorities found three shallow graves at the ranch exactly where Clark had stated they were. These graves did not contain complete bodies, but only parts. Clark and his sister Jessie testified that Northcott and his mother had exhumed the bodies on the evening of August 4, 1928, a few weeks before Clark was taken into protective custody. They had taken the bodies to a deserted area, where they were most likely burned in the night. The complete bodies were never recovered.

The evidence found in the graves consisted of "51 parts of human anatomy... those silent bits of evidence, of human bones and blood, have spoken and corroborated the testimony of living witnesses". This evidence enabled the authorities to conclude that Walter Collins, two brothers named Lewis and Nelson Winslow (aged 12 and 10, respectively), and the unidentified fourth victim had all been murdered. The body parts and Clark's testimony resulted in a death sentence for Gordon Northcott and life imprisonment for Sarah Louise Northcott, who was paroled in 1940. She died in 1944.

Aftermath 
Wineville changed its name to Mira Loma on November 1, 1930, in large part because of the negative publicity surrounding the murders. The new cities of Eastvale and Jurupa Valley took different parts of the area of Mira Loma in 2010 and 2011, respectively. Wineville Avenue, Wineville Road, Wineville Park, and other geographic references provide reminders of the community's former name.

Clark returned to Saskatoon, where city records indicate that he died on June 20, 1991.

Imprisonment and execution
Canadian police arrested Northcott and his mother on September 19, 1928. Due to errors in the extradition paperwork, they were not returned to Los Angeles until November 30, 1928.

While the two were being held in British Columbia awaiting extradition to California, Sarah confessed to the murders, including the murder of nine-year-old Walter Collins. But before being extradited to California, she retracted her confession, as did Northcott, who had confessed to killing more than five boys.

After Sarah and her son had been extradited from British Columbia to California, she once again confessed and pleaded guilty to killing Walter Collins. She was not tried; upon her plea of guilty, Superior Court Judge Morton sentenced her to life imprisonment on December 31, 1928, sparing her a death sentence because she was a woman. During her sentencing hearing, she claimed that her son was innocent and made a variety of claims about his parentage, including that he was an illegitimate son of an English nobleman, that she was Gordon's grandmother, and that he was the result of incest between her husband, Cyrus George Northcott, and their daughter. She also stated that as a child, Gordon was sexually abused by the entire family. After being sentenced, Sarah attempted to commit suicide and begged the authorities not to execute her son. "I got a square deal," she said. "If they'll just be good to my boy if they just won’t hang him!" After learning that her son would be hanged, Sarah begged the authorities to hang her as well. Sarah served her sentence at Tehachapi State Prison and was paroled after less than twelve years. She died in 1944.

Gordon Northcott was implicated in the murder of Walter Collins, but because his mother had already confessed and been sentenced for it, the state chose to not prosecute Gordon for that murder.

It was speculated that Gordon may have killed as many as 20 boys, but the State of California could not produce evidence to support that speculation. Ultimately, the state only brought an indictment against Gordon for the murders of an unidentified underage Mexican national (known as the "headless Mexican") and the brothers Lewis and Nelson Winslow (aged 12 and 10, respectively). The brothers had been reported missing from Pomona on May 16, 1928.

In early 1929, Gordon Northcott's trial was held before Judge George R. Freeman in Riverside County, California. The jury heard that he kidnapped, molested, tortured, and murdered the Winslow brothers and the "headless Mexican" in 1928. On February 8, 1929, the 27-day trial ended with Gordon being convicted of those murders.

On February 13, 1929, Freeman sentenced him to death and he was hanged on October 2, 1930 at San Quentin State Prison. He was 23 years old.

Involved people

Gordon Stewart Northcott (November 9, 1906 – October 2, 1930)

Christine Collins (December 14, 1888 – December 8, 1964)

Sanford Clark (March 1, 1913 – June 20, 1991)

Sanford's older sister, Jessie, became suspicious of the letters Sanford was forced to send home from Northcott's ranch. These letters assured the family that Sanford was well.

Jessie traveled to the ranch in Wineville and stayed there for several days. At night, Clark told his sister about the crimes that had been committed at the Ranch. Jessie became terrified of Northcott, left the ranch, and returned to Canada. There, she told the American consul about the crimes that had occurred at Wineville.

Sanford was not tried for murder because Assistant District Attorney Loyal C. Kelley believed very strongly that the boy was innocent. He said that Sanford had been a victim of Northcott's death threats and sexual abuse and was not a willing participant in the crimes committed at the chicken ranch.

Kelley told Sanford that he had secured an entirely unique settlement of Sanford's legal situation by having him taken to the nearby Whittier State School, where an experimental program for delinquent youths was under way. He assured Sanford that the Whittier school was unique because of its compassionate mission of genuine rehabilitation.

Sanford was sentenced to five years at the Whittier State School (later renamed the Fred C. Nelles Youth Correctional Facility). His sentence was later commuted to 23 months, as he "had impressed the Trustees with his temperament, job skills and his personal desire to live a productive life during his nearly two years there."

He died in 1991 at the age of 78, and was buried in Woodlawn Cemetery in Saskatoon, Saskatchewan in 1993.

Walter Collins (September 23, 1918 – 1928)
Nine-year-old Walter Collins was abducted when he went to the movies and never came back, on March 10, 1928. He lived in Lincoln Heights, Los Angeles.

Initially, his mother, Christine Collins, and the police believed that enemies of Walter Collins, Sr. had abducted Walter. Walter Collins, Sr. had been convicted of eight armed robberies and was an inmate at Folsom State Prison.

Walter Collins' disappearance received nationwide attention and the Los Angeles Police Department followed up hundreds of leads without success. The police faced negative publicity and increasing public pressure to solve the case.

Five months after Walter's disappearance, a boy claiming to be Walter was found in DeKalb, Illinois. Letters and photographs were exchanged before Walter's mother, Christine Collins, eventually paid for the boy to be brought to Los Angeles. A public reunion was organized by the police, who hoped to negate the bad publicity they had received for their failure to solve this case and others. The police also hoped that the uplifting story would deflect attention from a series of corruption scandals that had sullied the department's reputation. At the reunion, Christine stated that the boy was not her son. She was told by the officer in charge of the case, police Captain J. J. Jones, to take the boy home to "try him out for a couple of weeks". Christine hesitantly agreed to do that. 

Three weeks later, Christine returned to see Captain Jones and persisted in her claim that the boy was not Walter. Even though she had dental records proving it, Jones had her committed to the psychiatric ward at Los Angeles County Hospital under a "Code 12", a term used to jail or commit someone who was deemed difficult or inconvenient.

During Christine's incarceration, Jones questioned the boy, who admitted to being 12-year-old Arthur Hutchens, Jr., a runaway originally from Iowa. A drifter at a roadside café in Illinois had told Hutchens of his resemblance to the missing Walter, so Hutchens came up with a plan to impersonate Walter. His motive was to get to Hollywood so that he could meet his favorite actor, Tom Mix. 

Christine was released 10 days after Hutchens admitted that he was not her son. She then filed a lawsuit against the Los Angeles Police Department.

On September 13, 1930, Christine won a lawsuit against Jones and was awarded $10,800, which Jones never paid. The last newspaper account of Christine is from 1941, when she attempted to collect a $15,562 judgment against then-retired Captain Jones in the Superior Court.

Christine became hopeful that her son, Walter, might still be alive after her first interview with Gordon Stewart Northcott. She asked Northcott if he had killed her son, and after listening to his repeated lies, confessions, and recantations, she concluded that Northcott was insane. Because Northcott did not seem to know whether he had even met Walter, much less killed him, she clung to the hope that Walter was still alive.

Northcott sent Christine a telegram shortly before his execution, saying he had lied when he denied that Walter was among his victims. He promised to tell the truth, if she came in person to hear it. Just a few hours before the execution, Christine visited Northcott. But upon her arrival, he balked. "I don't want to see you," he said when she confronted him. "I don't know anything about it. I'm innocent."

A news account said, "The distraught woman was outraged by Northcott's conduct... but was also comforted by it. Northcott's ambiguous replies and his seeming refusal to remember such details as Walter's clothing and the color of his eyes gave her continued hope that her son still lived."

Lewis and Nelson Winslow 
Lewis, 12, and Nelson, 10, were the sons of Nelson Winslow, Sr. and his wife. The boys were abducted on May 16, 1928, from Pomona, California on their way home from a yacht club meeting. Northcott was convicted of kidnapping and killing them.

Mr. Winslow led a lynch mob to the Riverside County Jail, where Northcott was temporarily being held, with the intent of hanging Northcott after the completion of his trial but before his sentencing. Police convinced the mob to disband.

Arthur J. Hutchens, Jr., the imposter 
In 1933, Arthur J. Hutchens, Jr. wrote about how and why he impersonated the missing boy, Walter Collins. Hutchens' biological mother had died in 1925 when he was nine years old, and he had been living with his stepmother, Violet Hutchens.

Hutchens pretended to be Walter Collins to get as far away as possible from his stepmother. After living on the road for a month, he arrived in DeKalb, Illinois. When police brought him in, they began to ask him questions about Walter Collins. Initially he stated that he did not know about Walter, but changed his story when he saw a chance of getting to California.

He died in 1954.

Reverend Gustav Briegleb 
Briegleb was a Presbyterian minister and an early radio evangelist. He was the pastor of St. Paul's Presbyterian Church on Jefferson Boulevard at Third Avenue in Los Angeles, California.

He took up many important causes in the City of Los Angeles in the 1920s and 1930s, most notably the poor handling of the Walter Collins kidnapping case in 1928. He fought to have Christine Collins released from a mental hospital after she was committed there in retaliation for disagreeing with the Los Angeles Police Department's version of events. He died in 1943 at the age of 61.

The boy who came forward 
In 1935, five years after Northcott's execution, a boy and his parents came forward and spoke to authorities. Seven years earlier, the boy had gone missing, and the parents had reported his disappearance to the police. At the time of the boy's disappearance, authorities speculated that he might have been a murder victim at Wineville.
 
Sanford Clark, however, never told authorities that a boy had escaped from the chicken coop. The historical record and Sanford Clark's own testimony indicate that only three boys were ever held in the chicken coop. These were Walter Collins and the two Winslow brothers, all of whom were murdered.

In popular culture 

 The 2008 Clint Eastwood directed film Changeling, starring John Malkovich and Angelina Jolie, is partly based on the Wineville Chicken Coop Murders. The film centers around Christine Collins, her struggles against the LAPD, and her search to find Walter. In the film, Northcott was portrayed by Jason Butler Harner.
 "The Big Imposter" — episode #104 of the radio series Dragnet — was based upon these events. It aired on June 7, 1951. When the series was moved to television, the radio script was made into a teleplay. It aired on December 4, 1952.
 One of the plotlines of American Horror Story: Hotel centers around the murders. In a flashback, the son of Ms. Evers, maid of the Hotel Cortez, is abducted by a man on Halloween. The surrounding events imply her son was one of Gordon Northcott's unidentified victims.
 "Body Farm", episode 12 of season 3 of the Investigation Discovery series Evil Kin, focuses on the Wineville Chicken Coop Murders, and examines early warning signs of Northcott's pedophilia, his abusive relationship with Sanford, Jessie's rescue of Sanford, and Sarah Louise's obsessive love for her son. It aired on October 6, 2015.
 The 2009 Criminal Minds episode "Haunted" features a character based on Gordon Stewart Northcott called the Hollow Creek Killer.

See also

 List of murdered American children
 List of people who disappeared
 Disappearance of Bobby Dunbar, missing person case in which a non-related child was returned to the family of the missing boy.

References

Notes

Bibliography

External links 
 Northcott  A collection of 121 photographs associated with the Wineville case in the Los Angeles Public Library.
 Riverside Public Library, Northcott Murders: James Jeffrey Paul's Research Materials. A collection of materials donated by James Jeffrey Paul, which were used in the research for his book, Nothing is Strange with You: The Life and Crimes of Gordon Stewart Northcott.
Wineville Chicken Coop Murders at Crime Museum

1926 in California
1926 murders in the United States
1927 in California
1928 in California
American murder victims
Axe murder
Child sexual abuse in the United States
Formerly missing people
History of Los Angeles
Incidents of violence against boys
Jurupa Valley, California
Kidnappings in the United States
Missing people
Missing person cases in California
Murder in Riverside County, California
Murdered American children
Murdered Mexican children
People murdered in California
Serial murders in the United States
Sexual assaults in the United States
Torture in the United States
Unidentified American children
Unidentified murder victims in California
Violence against men in North America